Strathclyde Law School was established in 1964 and operates within the Faculty of Humanities & Social Sciences at the University of Strathclyde, in Glasgow, Scotland.

The Law School currently operates from the Lord Hope Building (named after Lord Hope of Craighead, former Chancellor of the University and former Deputy President of the UK Supreme Court).

The Law School offers a full range of undergraduate and postgraduate taught and research degrees.

Courses offered
Undergraduate 
LLB (Honours and Pass) 
LLB in Law and a Modern Language 
LLB Part-time 
LLB Graduate Entry (2 years Accelerated Course) 
LLB (Clinical) 
LLB Dual Qualifying in Scots and English Law 
LLB English Law 
BA (Honours and Pass)

Post-Graduate 
Diploma in Professional Legal Practice  
LLM/PgDip/PgCert in Law 
LLM/PgDip in Construction Law 
LLM/PgDip/PgCert in Internet Law and Policy 
LLM/PgDip/PgCert in Human Rights Law 
LLM/PgDip/PgCert in International Law and Sustainable Development 
LLM/PgDip/PgCert in International Commercial Law 
LLM/PgDip/PgCert in Global Environmental Law and Governance
LLM/PgDip/PgCert in Climate Change Law and Policy
MSc/PgDip/PgCert in Mediation and Conflict Resolution 
LLM/MSc/PgDip/PgCert in Criminal Justice and Penal Change 
LLM in Law and Finance 
LLM/PgDip/PgCert in Law of the Sea, Sustainable Development and International Law 
LLM in Professional Legal Practice

PhD/MPhil by Research

Research Centres 
The Centre for Professional Legal Studies
The Centre for Law, Crime and Justice 
The Centre for the Study of Human Rights Law 
The Centre for Internet Law and Policy 
Strathclyde Centre for Environmental Law and Governance

Heads of Department

Teaching awards

According to The Complete University Guide, Strathclyde Law School is in the UK's top 10 (2020). According to Times Higher Education, the University of Strathclyde was placed 76th best in law globally among universities in 2018.

Professor Kenneth Norrie was awarded Scottish Law Lecturer of the Year 2007 at the Law Awards of Scotland, and the Law School obtained more nominations than any other law school in 2007, with Professors Norrie, Robson and Rodger being nominated.

The nominations for the 2008 award also included two Strathclyde Law School lecturers: Professor John Blackie and Professor Donald Nicolson.

In the 2009 New Year Honours List Professor Alan Paterson was awarded an OBE for services to law and legal education. In 2011, Professor Donald Nicolson was appointed an OBE for services to the legal profession.

The Law Clinic

The University of Strathclyde Law Clinic was set up in October 2003 by Professor Donald Nicolson, and was the first University-run Law Clinic in Scotland.  The Law Clinic offers free legal advice and help to residents of Glasgow and the surrounding area who cannot afford a solicitor or do not qualify for legal aid.  Dealing mainly with employment law and small claims issues, the Clinic has branched out in recent years into a variety of projects including an immigration unit, the Scottish Women's Rights Centre, and schools and prisons projects.

The current Law Clinic offices are located on Level 5 of the Graham Hills Building, on the University of Strathclyde John Anderson campus.

In 2016, the University of Strathclyde Law School won the pro bono award at the Scott and Co. Law Awards in Edinburgh.  The Law Clinic has also won awards at the Law Works and Attorney General Awards in London: in 2016 Fergus Lawrie was given the prize for best contribution by an individual student, a prize that was also won on a previous occasion (in 2014) by Jacky Wall.

The University of Strathclyde Law Clinic is now the biggest law clinic in the UK and is primarily run by a committee of students.

Mooting
The Law School has an active mooting society, which organises an internal competition for Strathclyde students and competes in various Scottish and UK external competitions.

Fiona Malone and Lucy Brunton won the final of the inaugural NSLS Scottish Cup in the Court of Session in January 2015.  Drew Long and Jonny Brown reached the semi-finals of the Alexander Stone Moot 2015, and Clara Smeaton and Drew Long won the annual Sheriff Cup Moot against the University of Glasgow, judged by Lady Wolffe from the Court of Session, in April 2015.

In 2016, a team from Strathclyde (Michael Anderson, Eddie Ferguson, and Clara Smeaton) went to the London qualifying rounds of the Jessup Moot.  Also in 2016, Strathclyde hosted the European qualifiers for the Manfred Lachs Space Law moot and entered a team who reached the semi-finals of the European fixtures. In April 2015, the University of Strathclyde Mooting Society was asked to provide a team to represent the UK in the Commonwealth Moot Competition, which was held in Glasgow, when one of the teams had to pull out at the last minute.

In 2014, Clara Smeaton and Vanessa Puthucheary were runners-up in the ICLR mooting competition after successfully beating over 20 English university teams, on points of English law, to reach the final.

Alumni
 Elish Angiolini QC, former Lord Advocate
 William Bain, former MP for Glasgow North East
 Alastair Campbell, Lord Bracadale, Senator of the College of Justice
 Dougie Donnelly, Journalist and Broadcaster for the BBC
 Annabel Goldie, former MSP and former Leader of the Scottish Conservative Party
 Paul Laverty, Screenwriter
 Paul G. McBride QC, former Vice-Chairman of the Faculty of Advocates
 Ann McKechin, former MP for Glasgow North
 Pauline McNeill, MSP for Glasgow Kelvin
 Lauren Mayberry, Scottish singer with the band Chvrches
 Margaret Mitchell, MSP for Central Scotland
 Nicola Irvine, Dean of Royal Faculty of Procurators in Glasgow
 Aamer Anwar, Rector of University of Glasgow, Lawyer of the Year 2017, Solicitor of the Year 2016 
 Iain Peebles, Lord Bannatyne, Senator of the College of Justice
Tommy Sheridan Scottish politician

See also
 University of Strathclyde
 Legal education in the United Kingdom
 Scots Law

References

External links
 Strathclyde Law School
 University of Strathclyde Law Clinic

Educational institutions established in 1964
Law schools in Scotland
University of Strathclyde
1964 establishments in Scotland